Beatriz Jiménez Linuesa (born 26 May 1985) is a Spanish politician, member of the Congress of Deputies since 2019.

She had been member of Cortes of Castilla–La Mancha between 2011 and 2015 and city councilor of Cuenca between 2012 and 2015. On 13 March 2020 she announced via Twitter that she had been  infected with SARS-CoV-2 during the ongoing coronavirus pandemic.

References 

1985 births
Living people
Members of the 14th Congress of Deputies (Spain)
Members of the 8th Cortes of Castilla–La Mancha
Spanish educators
Spanish women educators
People from Cuenca, Spain
People's Party (Spain) politicians
21st-century Spanish women politicians